Cockspur Street is a short street in the City of Westminster, London,  within which a very short part of Trafalgar Square links Charing Cross to Pall Mall/Pall Mall East at the point where that road changes name, opposite the traffic exit from Haymarket. It and all the streets mentioned are part of the A4. It has existed since at least the 16th century along a similar line.


History

A map of 1572 shows the street in existence.

In 1746, John Roque's detailed map of London and ten miles around shows Cockspur Street and two very narrow passages connecting, which were later variously abolished and widened.

After Regent Street was built heading north, Pall Mall was extended directly east. This enabled the present one-way flow around the triangle facing the north side of Cockspur Street. All the small-plot properties between Cockspur Street and the newly formed Pall Mall East were pulled down, leaving a triangular site which was taken by the College of Physicians and the Union Club.

Properties
Number 1, Oceanic House, was originally the London office of the Oceanic Steam Navigation Company trading as the White Star Line, which operated famous liners including the RMS Titanic. "Oceanic House" is inscribed twice on the building and it forms part of Canada House. It was also the Pall Mall Restaurant at one point.

Undivided from this are numbers 2–4, the Serious Fraud Office. Numbers 2–4 were the Canadian Military Headquarters from 1939 to 1947.

Numbers 6 to 13 are no longer used, having made way for new wider street layouts. 14-16 was the Hamburg-Amerika House, London office of the Hamburg America Line. It was put up for sale in 1917 under the Trading with the Enemy Act 1914.

In news and literature
On 29 June 2007, a car containing explosives was found on the street. It was removed and further investigated.
The celebrated 'Irish Giant' Charles Byrne, who was reputedly just over 7 feet 7 inches tall (2.31m), died in 1783 at the age of 22 at his lodgings in Cockspur Street. Byrne's skeleton is preserved in the Hunterian Museum of the Royal College of Surgeons in England.

Further reading

Architecture and lost buildings
 Survey of London, vol. 16 (1935), St Martin-in-The-Fields, Pt III: Trafalgar Square and Neighbourhood.  Relevant chapters are: "Site of Nos. 25-34, Cockspur Street"; "Nos. 21-24, Cockspur Street and the Two Chairmen"; "Site of Nos. 13-20, Cockspur Street"; "[Trafalgar Square] Between 66 Charing Cross [the old name for the north end of Whitehall] and the Cockspur Street entrance to Spring Gardens".
 Survey of London, vol. 20 (1940).

References

Streets in the City of Westminster
A4 road (England)